Jens Hellström (born 9 August 1977 in Järfalla, Uppland) is a Swedish auto racing driver.

Career
He has raced mainly in touring cars, including the Swedish Touring Car Championship and the Swedish Volvo S40 Challenge. His last campaign in the STCC was in 2005, driving a Honda Civic Type R for Engström Motorsport. Also that year, he competed in the first two rounds of the inaugural FIA World Touring Car Championship season at Monza. He finished twenty-sixth in race one, and twenty-first in the second race.

Racing record

Complete World Touring Car Championship results
(key) (Races in bold indicate pole position) (Races in italics indicate fastest lap)

References

1977 births
Living people
People from Järfälla Municipality
Swedish racing drivers
Swedish Touring Car Championship drivers
World Touring Car Championship drivers
Sportspeople from Stockholm County